Chazhoor (Chazhur) is a village in Thrissur Taluk of Thrissur district in the state of Kerala, India. Thriprayar (4 km), Thrissur (22 km), and Chavakkad (17 km) are nearby cities. Chazhoor is 4 km away from Snehatheeram beach.

Demographics
 India census, Chazhoor had a population of 6,541 with 3,022 males and 3,519 females.

Civic administration
For administrative purposes, the Chazhoor panchayat is divided into 18 wards, from which the members of the panchayat are elected for five years.

History 

Chazhoor village holds the ancient palace of Chazhoor (Chazhur) kovilakom. This is the root (moola thavazhi) of the Cochin royal family, in Ernakulam district (Perumpadapu Swaroopam).

The Naalukettu (Kerala style of joint family house) of Chazhoor royal family is in this village.

Chazhur Pazhayannur Bhagavathy temple is in this village, famous as an important Deity of Perumpadappu Swaroopam. This village is beautiful  with a lot of Paddy fields and water bodies. As a remote village, development was slow in this area. Main income for the people was agriculture and toddy tapping.

Politics

Chazhoor panchayat is part of Thrissur Parliament constituency and Nattika Legislative constituency.
The current MP is T N Prathapan and MLA is Geetha Gopi.

Educational institutions
 Govt LP School, Alapad
 Sree Narayana Memorial High School, Chazhoor
 ALP School, Chazhoor
 Gokulam Public School, Pazhuvil
 St. Antony's High School, Pazhuvil
 SBHS KURUMPILAVU

Places of worship
 Chazhur Pazhayannur temple
 Parakkulangara Sri dharmasastha temple
 Chazhur Juma Masjid
 Thachandra Bhagavathy Temple
 Chethikkattil Temple
 Saint Mary's church Chazhur

References

Villages in Thrissur district